The second season of Bake Off Celebridades premiered on Saturday, March 5, 2022, at  (BRT / AMT) on SBT, aiming to find the best celebrity baker in Brazil.

Bakers
It featured a returning contestant: Carlo Porto (from Bake Off SBT 1).

The following is a list of contestants:

Results summary

Key
  Star Baker
  Judges' favourite bakers
  Advanced
  Judges' bottom bakers
  Eliminated
  Runner-up
  Winner

Technical challenges ranking

Key
  Star Baker
  Eliminated

Ratings and reception

Brazilian ratings
All numbers are in points and provided by Kantar Ibope Media.

References

External links 
 Bake Off Celebridades on SBT

2022 Brazilian television seasons